Octotoma scabripennis, known as the lantana leafminer or lantana leaf beetle is a species of insect in the family Chrysomelidae. It is naturally found in Central America. This beetle is used in Australia to control the plant Lantana camara.

References

Cassidinae
Beetles described in 1844
Beetles of Central America
Insects used as insect pest control agents